Thricops septentrionalis is a species of house fly in the family Muscidae.

References

External links

 

Muscidae
Articles created by Qbugbot
Insects described in 1898